Standings and results for Group 1 of the UEFA Euro 1988 qualifying tournament.

Group 1 consisted of Albania, Austria, Romania and Spain. Group winners were Spain, who finished 1 point clear of second-placed Romania.

Final table

Results

Goalscorers

References
UEFA Page
 RSSSF Page

Group 1
1986–87 in Spanish football
qual
1986–87 in Austrian football
1987–88 in Austrian football
1986–87 in Albanian football
1987–88 in Albanian football
1986–87 in Romanian football
1987–88 in Romanian football